The Marie-Josée Kravis Prize for New Music at the New York Philharmonic is awarded to "a composer for extraordinary artistic endeavor in the field of new music." The prize money is US$200,000. The prize includes also a commission for the New York Philharmonic. The award is given biennially. The Orchestra named also Kravis Emerging Composers, who receive a US$50,000 stipend and a commission. A US$10 million gift in 2009 founded the prize. The money was given to the New York Philharmonic by Henry R. Kravis in honor of his wife, Marie-Josée.

Recipients
 2011 Henri Dutilleux
 2014 Per Nørgård
 2016 Louis Andriessen
 2018 Unsuk Chin

Kravis Emerging Composers
 2012 Sean Shepherd
 2015 Anna Thorvaldsdottir

References

External links
 

American music awards
Classical music awards
Awards established in 2011
2011 establishments in New York City
New York Philharmonic